Moore Island is an uninhabited island in the Qikiqtaaluk Region, Nunavut, Canada. It is a member of the Queen Elizabeth Islands group. It lies in Intrepid Passage, south of Bathurst Island. It measures about  along its longest axis.

References

Islands of the Queen Elizabeth Islands
Uninhabited islands of Qikiqtaaluk Region